Vác FC is a Hungarian football club based in Vác, north of Budapest. The club of the second division of the Hungarian League was established in June 1899 as Váci Városi SE  plays its home matches at the Stadion Városi Vác. Before 2009, the club was known by a variety of other names.

Name
The team has undergone a number of name changes since its inception, often due to the politics of the time, and since 2003 has been named after the Dunakanyar, Hungarian for Danube Bend, the point where the Danube river changes direction near where Vác is located.

 1899-48: Váci SE
 1948–55: Váci Dolgozók TK
 1955-55: Váci Petőfi
 1955–57: Váci Bástya
 1957-57: Váci SE
 1957–61: Váci Petőfi
 1961–65: Váci Vasas
 1965–70: Váci SE
 1970–80: Váci Híradás
 1980–92: Váci Izzó MTE
 1992–97: Vác FC-Samsung
 1997–98: Vác FC
 1998-01: Vác FC-Zollner
 2001–03: Váci VLSE
 2003–07: Dunakanyar-Vác FC
 2007–09: Vác-Újbuda LTC
 2009–13  Dunakanyar-Vác FC
 2013–     Vác FC

History

Domestic
The club was founded on 28 November 1899 as Váci Sportegyesület. The main activities were cycling, fencing, gymnastics and tennis. The first (friendly) match of the football team was played on 24 May 1904 against Műegyetem FC (now Műegyetemi AFC – university team in Budapest, they were in the second league in that time), and lost 0–3.

Before 1926 in the Hungarian football system there were only Budapest teams allowed to play in the first league. There were regional championships (kerületi bajnokság) for the non-Budapest (Hungarian: vidéki) teams. Váci SE has won two regional titles in 1913 and 1924.

After 1926 the new professional league was open for the non-Budapest teams, but Váci SE couldn't afford to have a professional team. In the August 1948 two clubs, Váci AC (founded: 1920) and Váci Reménység (founded: 1922) were merged into Váci SE, and the club was renamed as Váci Dolgozók TK.

In 1986–1987 under János Csank the team won the NB II. Division and was promoted to the I. division, where they would spend the next 13 years. They reached the Hungarian Cup final in 1991 and 1992, but lost 0–1 against Ferencvárosi TC and 0–1 after extra time against Újpest FC. In 1991–1992 and 1992–1993 they barely finished in 2nd behind Ferencvárosi TC and later Kispest-Honvéd. In 1993–1994 they won the Hungarian League for the first and only time. The following year, however, was their most dismal year thus far in the first division, but they reached the cup final again, and lost again against Ferencváros 0–2, 3–4.

In 2000 the league reorganized to relegate the bottom two teams and Vác, who had put up their most miserable season to date, was relegated to the II. division. By 2001 they fell further to the III. division. After this, with the help of young players—on average 20.7 years old—the team returned to II. division play in 2003.

In 2005–2006 they won the NB II. Eastern Division and earned the right to enter the first division. The 2006–2007 saw little success, and the team was relegated at the bottom of the table. Many of the team's players were only semi-professional and work other jobs besides football.

In the summer of 2007 an amateur club from the district XI of Budapest, Újbuda-Lágymányosi TC were merged into the club.

NB I. Division results

International
They played in the UEFA Champions League 1994-95, losing both matches, 3–0 and 2–1, against Paris Saint-Germain F.C., from France.

They fared little better in the UEFA Cup Winners' Cup 1995-96, where they had one draw and one loss to FK Sileks Kratovo, from the Republic of Macedonia, losing 2–4 agg.

The team's only international wins came in the UEFA Cup. In the UEFA Cup 1991-92 they beat FC Dynamo Moscow 1–0 in the first leg, but lost the second leg 1–4 and did not advance. In the UEFA Cup 1992-93 they defeated their first round opponent F.C. Groningen 1–0 and 1–1, only to be defeated by S.L. Benfica in the second round 1–5 and 0–1. In the UEFA Cup 1993-94 they won their first match against Apollon Limassol 2–0, but lost the second 0–4 and didn't make it out of the first round.

All-time International Results

Honours
 Hungarian League:
 Winners (1): 1993–94 (as Vác-Samsung)
 Hungarian Cup:
 Runner-up (3): 1990–91 (as Váci Izzó), 1991–92, 1994–95
 Hungarian Second Division:
 Winners (2): 1986–87, 2005–06
 Regional Championship (Kerületi Bajnokság):
 Winners (2): 1913, 1924

Current squad

European cup history

UEFA Cup Winners' Cup

UEFA Intertoto Cup

UEFA Cup

UEFA Champions League

External links
 

Football clubs in Hungary
Dunakanyar-Vác FC
1899 establishments in Hungary
Association football clubs established in 1899
Vác